Arch Hill may refer to:
 Arch Hill, New Zealand, a suburb of Auckland
 Arch Hill Recordings, a recording studio located in the Auckland suburb
 Arch Hill (New Zealand electorate), a parliamentary electorate named after the Auckland suburb